The Master..., is an album by baritone saxophonist Pepper Adams which was recorded in 1980 and originally released on the Muse label.

Reception

The Allmusic review by Ken Dryden states "This 1980 studio date with Tommy Flanagan, George Mraz, and Leroy Williams is a stimulating outing, dominated by the leader's originals".

Track listing
All compositions by Pepper Adams except where noted.
 "Enchilada Baby" – 5:41	
 "Chelsea Bridge" (Billy Strayhorn) – 8:58	
 "Bossallegro" – 6:03	
 "Rue Serpente" – 8:10	
 "Lovers of Their Time" – 6:07	
 "My Shining Hour" (Harold Arlen, Johnny Mercer) – 7:32

Personnel
Pepper Adams – baritone saxophone
Tommy Flanagan – piano
George Mraz – bass
Leroy Williams – drums

References

Pepper Adams albums
1980 albums
Muse Records albums